Greene v. Fisher, 565 U.S. 34 (2011), is a decision by the Supreme Court of the United States involving the Antiterrorism and Effective Death Penalty Act (AEDPA), which sets the standard of review for habeas corpus petitions brought in federal court to challenge state court convictions. AEDPA requires that to be set aside, the state court judgment must have been "contrary to, or involved an unreasonable application of, clearly established Federal law as determined by the Supreme Court of the United States."

In a unanimous opinion delivered by Justice Antonin Scalia, the Court ruled in Greene that "clearly established Federal law" under AEDPA does not include Supreme Court decisions that are announced after the last adjudication of the merits in state court but before the defendant's conviction becomes final.

Further reading

External links 
 
 
 Brief for Petitioner

United States Supreme Court cases
United States Supreme Court cases of the Roberts Court
United States habeas corpus case law
2011 in United States case law